The Roman Catholic Diocese of Impfondo is a Catholic diocese located in the town of Impfondo in the Ecclesiastical province of Owando in the Republic of the Congo.

History
On 30 October 2000, Pope John Paul II established the Prefecture Apostolic of Likouala from the Diocese of Ouesso.  It was elevated to a diocese on 11 February 2011 by Pope Benedict XVI.

Ordinaries
Prefect of Likouala
Fr. Jean Gardin, C.S.Sp. (30 October 2000 - 11 February 2011); see below
Bishop of Impfondo
Jean Gardin, C.S.Sp. (11 February 2011 – 12 December 2019); see above
Daniel Nzika (12 December 2019 – present)

References

Roman Catholic dioceses in the Republic of the Congo
Christian organizations established in 2000
Roman Catholic dioceses and prelatures established in the 20th century
Roman Catholic Ecclesiastical Province of Owando